Allocasuarina defungens, commonly known as the dwarf heath casuarina, is a species of casuarinaceae (ironwood) native to the NSW north coast in Australia.

It has a lignotuber and has smooth bark. It forms irregularly shaped cones.

References

defungens
Fagales of Australia
Flora of New South Wales
Trees of Australia
Plants described in 1989